Lluis Clavell Ortiz-Repiso (born 13 October 1941) is a Roman Catholic priest.

Career 
Although born in Barcelona, he spent all his childhood in Arenys de Mar where his father was the director of "El Forn del Vidre" (a Philips lamp factory). He was ordained priest on August 7, 1966, along with 23 other members of the Opus Dei, celebrating his first Mass on August 16, 1966, in the Church of the Royal Monastery of Santa Maria de Pedralbes.

Clavell was professor of philosophy at the University of Navarra. Graduated in Philosophy at the University of Barcelona   he became an alumnus of the Pontifical Lateran University in Rome where he earned a Doctorate in Philosophy.

Clavell is Professor of Metaphysics at the Pontifical University of the Holy Cross (Rome), of which he was rector. In the present, he is a member of the Roman Curia as President of the Pontifical Academy of St. Thomas Aquinas.

Work
 György Lukács. Historia y conciencia de clase y estética, Madrid, Magisterio Español, 1975, 204 pp. 
 Metafísica, Pamplona, EUNSA, 1984, 247 pp. 
 Metafisica e libertà, Roma, Armando, 1996, 207 pp. 
 Metaphysics, Manila, Sinag-Tala, 1991, XII, 249 pp. 
 El nombre propio de Dios según Santo Tomás de Aquino, Pamplona, EUNSA, 1980, 201 pp. 
 Razón y fe en la universidad: ¿oposición o colaboración?, Pamplona, Servicio de Publicaciones de la Universidad de Navarra, 2011, 10 pp. 
 Carlos Cardona, Olvido y memoria del ser, edición de Ignacio Guiu y Lluís Clavell, Pamplona, EUNSA, 1997, 517 pp.

See also
Priestly Society of the Holy Cross
Timeline of Opus Dei

References

External links
Catholic Hierarchy: Bishop Lluis Clavell Ortiz-Repiso

1943 births
Living people
Opus Dei members
20th-century Spanish Roman Catholic priests
University of Navarra alumni
Pontifical University of Saint Thomas Aquinas alumni
University of Barcelona alumni
Academic staff of the Pontifical University of the Holy Cross